Bandi Sher Khan is one of the 44 union councils, administrative subdivisions, of Haripur District in the Khyber Pakhtunkhwa Province of Pakistan.

References

Union councils of Haripur District